Leonardo Daniel Acosta Díaz (born March 21, 1977) is a Uruguayan association football forward currently playing for Patronato de Paraná of the Primera B Nacional in Argentina. He was born in Montevideo.

References
 
 

1977 births
Living people
Uruguayan footballers
Rampla Juniors players
Deportivo Colonia players
Real Arroyo Seco footballers
C.A. Rentistas players
Guillermo Brown footballers
Unión de Sunchales footballers
Club y Biblioteca Ramón Santamarina footballers
Club Atlético Patronato footballers
Uruguayan expatriate footballers
Expatriate footballers in Argentina
Association football forwards